Gerhard Harpers (12 March 1928 – 27 May 2016) was a German international footballer who played for VfL Bochum,  SV Sodingen and Fortuna Düsseldorf.

References

External links
 

1928 births
2016 deaths
Association football midfielders
German footballers
Germany international footballers
VfL Bochum players
Fortuna Düsseldorf players
Sportspeople from Bochum
Footballers from North Rhine-Westphalia